Nikolai Lazarevich Tarasov (1882, Moscow – October 1910, Moscow) was an Armenian–Russian oil-industrialist and dandy, who was a devotee of the theatre.

Biography 
He was born as Nikoghayos Torosian in a family of Armenian traders from Armavir. From 1906 he financially supported Moscow Art Theatre and became a member of theatre's direction. In 1908, along with his friend Nikita Balieff, he co-founded the Moscow Bat theatre (La Chauve-Souris), to organise comedy evenings for members of the Arts Theatre.

He committed suicide in 1910. Tarasov's tomb at the Moscow Armenian Cemetery is a modernist style work by sculptor Nikolai Andreev.

References

Links 
History of three suicides

Armenian people from the Russian Empire
1882 births
1910 deaths
Suicides by firearm in Russia
Russian businesspeople in the oil industry
Businesspeople from the Russian Empire
1910 suicides